Sotiris S. Xantheas (Σωτηρης Ξανθεας) is a Laboratory Fellow in the Advanced Computing, Mathematics and Data Division at Pacific Northwest National Laboratory (PNNL) in Richland, WA (https://www.pnnl.gov/science/staff/staff_info.asp?staff_num=5610) and an Affiliate Professor, UW - PNNL Distinguished Faculty Fellow in the Department of Chemistry at the University of Washington in Seattle, WA, USA (http://depts.washington.edu/chem/people/faculty/xantheas.html). He is an adjunct professor in the Department of Mathematics and Statistics at Washington State University in Pullman, WA, USA (http://www.math.wsu.edu/faculty/sxantheas/), and a specially appointed professor in the World Research Hub Initiative (WRHI) at the Tokyo Technological Institute in Tokyo, Japan (http://www.wrhi.iir.titech.ac.jp/en/news/announcement/6857/). He is an Elected Fellow of the American Association for the Advancement of Science, the American Physical Society, and the Washington State Academy of Sciences (WSAS), a Marie Curie Fellow, a Fellow of the Japan Society for the Promotion of Science (JSPS) and a visiting Fellow at the Institute for Advanced Study at the Technical University of Munich at Garching, Germany. He is the recipient of the  "Friedrich Wilhelm Bessel" Award from the Alexander von Humboldt Foundation in Bonn, Germany, and the Director’s Award for Exceptional Scientific Achievement at PNNL (twice).

References

Year of birth missing (living people)
Living people
Fellows of the American Association for the Advancement of Science
21st-century American physicists
Fellows of the American Physical Society